"She's Got a Way with Words" is a song recorded by American country music artist Blake Shelton for his tenth studio album If I'm Honest (2016) and would be used for Shelton's other album Fully Loaded: God's Country (2019). Released to radio as the album's third single on June 13, 2016, the track was written by Wyatt Earp, Andy Albert and Marc Beeson, while production was handled by Scott Hendricks.

Performance
The song debuted at number 28 on the Hot Country Songs chart on the release of the album If I'm Honest, selling 26,000 copies for the week. It debuted at number 54 on the Country Airplay chart the following week ahead of its official release to radio. It became the most-added of the song on its official release. Reaching a peak of number 7 on the Billboard Country Airplay chart, "She's Got a Way with Words" became Shelton's first single to miss number one since "I'll Just Hold On" in 2009, ending a streak of seventeen consecutive number one hits for him. The song has sold 284,000 copies in the United States as of October 2016. It was certified Gold by the RIAA on December 9, 2016.

Music video
The music video was directed by Adam Rothlein and premiered in June 2016.

Charts

Weekly charts

Year-end charts

Certifications

References

2016 singles
2016 songs
Blake Shelton songs
Warner Records Nashville singles
Songs written by Marc Beeson
Song recordings produced by Scott Hendricks
Songs written by Andy Albert